Mark Abrahams may refer to:
 Mark Abrahams (photographer) (born 1958), American fashion and portrait photographer
 Mark Abrahams (musician) (born 1978), English guitarist

See also
 Marc Abrahams, editor and co-founder of Annals of Improbable Research, and the originator of the Ig Nobel Prize celebration
 Mark Abraham (born 1953), member of the Louisiana Senate